The Fifth Legislative Assembly of Chhattisgarh constituted after the 2018 Chhattisgarh Legislative Assembly elections which were concluded on November 2018, with the results being declared on 11 December 2018. The tenure of 5th Chhattisgarh Assembly ends on 5 January 2024.

Members of Legislative Assembly

References 

 
Chhattisgarh